The Alfa Romeo Tonale (Type 965) is a crossover SUV produced by Italian car manufacturer Alfa Romeo. Introduced in February 2022, the Tonale is the first hybrid-powered Alfa Romeo. It slots below the Alfa Romeo Stelvio and became the first new model introduced by the brand in six years. The Tonale marks the brand's electrification effort, where Alfa Romeo will be the first brand among the 14 brands of Stellantis to go fully electric by 2027. The Tonale is named after the Tonale mountain pass in Northern Italy. 

In August 2022, a rebadged and restyled version was unveiled as the Dodge Hornet, exclusive to the North American market as the smallest, entry-level SUV offering from Dodge with an emphasis on performance. The Hornet will be sold alongside the Tonale in the region with different specs and lower pricing.

Overview 
The production Tonale was originally scheduled for release in 2021, but was delayed until 2022 due to the global semiconductor shortage and Alfa Romeo management demanding better range and performance from its drivetrain. It was developed during the ownership of Fiat Chrysler Automobiles and underpinned by a heavily modified version of the SCCS crossover platform shared with the Jeep Compass. It is also the first Alfa Romeo to be equipped with an optional plug-in hybrid system, which uses a  lithium-ion battery to achieve  of all-electric range.

All models of the Tonale are equipped with a 12.3-inch digital infotainment cluster and a 10.25-inch infotainment screen, which will run on the Uconnect 5 software suite. In addition, the Tonale will come with an NFT that records and stores data of the car's life cycle. According to Alfa Romeo, the NFT will generate a certificate that can help maintain the car's residual value. The Verge noted that Alfa Romeo had not provided much information about what blockchain technology they intended to use for this. Jalopnik felt that digitising a car's service history was a good idea, but that blockchain NFTs were a "bad" and "entirely unnecessary" way to achieve this.

According to Alfa Romeo, the Tonale was designed to offer more driving engagement than the class average by using a very quick steering rack (2.3 turns lock to lock). It also features torque vectoring by braking, frequency-selective dampers as standard, and adaptive items and four-piston brakes on the range-topping Veloce.

Powertrain 
One of the powertrain options is a newly developed Alfa Romeo-exclusive  1.5-liter petrol engine with a variable-geometry turbocharger (VGT) and 48 V hybrid system, paired with a 7-speed TCT dual-clutch transmission and a 48 V  and  P2 electric motor ( with a 2.5:1 transmission ratio). It can propel the wheels even when the internal combustion engine is turned off. The engine comes with a compression ratio of 12.5:1, a new cylinder head with a compact combustion chamber, dual variable valve timing, and "high-tumble" intake ducts.

A 48 V lithium-ion battery with a 0.8 kWh capacity is used. The battery has a volume of about 11 litres and does not affect the size of the boot, as it is installed under the central tunnel between the front seats. The dual voltage system with a DC/DC converter from 48 to 12 volts manages the interface with the electrical architecture of the vehicle.

Markets

Europe
The Alfa Romeo Tonale debuted to the press in Europe by taking to the roads at Tempio Voltiano around Lake Como, where Alessandro Volta invented one of the first batteries.

At the European launch, Alfa Romeo offered the Tonale in the exclusive "Edizione Speciale" version. This version includes a special configuration for the first customers of the Tonale. Later versions of the Tonale for the European market offer as standard equipment 18-inch alloy wheels, parking sensors, an electrically-operated tailgate, Apple CarPlay and Android Auto, and wireless charging. More upmarket models add minor styling changes and adaptive dampers.

North America 

The Tonale for Canada will be released for the 2023 model year, with the option of a 2.0 L petrol turbocharged engine or a 1.3 L petrol plug-in hybrid engine. For the US market, only the PHEV option will be available.

Dodge Hornet 
The Hornet was released in August 2022 for the U.S. and Canada. Compared to the Tonale, the Hornet received a restyled front end, headlights, and taillights. Priced below the Tonale, two models are offered, which are the Hornet R/T plug-in hybrid and Hornet GT. These are powered by a 1.3 L petrol plug-in hybrid engine and a 2.0 L petrol turbocharged engine (marketed as the "Hurricane4") respectively. It is built alongside the Tonale in Italy. Dodge CEO Tim Kuniskis announced plans for a more powerful model, the Hornet GLH ("Goes Like Hell").

Concept version 
The Tonale Concept was unveiled in March 2019 at the Geneva Motor Show. It features a plug-in hybrid drivetrain from the Jeep Renegade, presumably with a front-mounted petrol engine and a rear-mounted electric motor. Different driving modes were featured: Dual Power mode for maximum performance, Natural mode for everyday use, and Advanced Efficiency for electric propulsion only. Additional touchscreen settings were claimed to further adjust throttle behaviour, braking response, and steering feel.

References

External links 

 Official website

Tonale
Plug-in hybrid vehicles
Luxury crossover sport utility vehicles
Compact sport utility vehicles
Cars introduced in 2022